Sofron may refer to:

 Sofron Mudry, Ukrainian Bishop of the Ukrainian Catholic Church
 Sofron Dmyterko, Ukrainian Bishop of the Ukrainian Greek Catholic Church

 István Sofron, Hungarian professional ice hockey player

See also 
 Sofronije
 Sofronie
 Sofronia
 Sophronia (disambiguation)
 Sophronius (disambiguation)